William Heath Byford (March 20, 1817May 21, 1890) was an American physician, surgeon, gynecologist and advocate of medical education for women who was most notable for founding the Chicago Medical College and Woman's Medical College of Chicago.

Byford was born in Eaton, Ohio. After graduating from the Medical College of Ohio, he served on multiple chairs at the Evansville Medical College and Rush Medical College. In 1859, after he quit from Rush, he founded the Chicago Medical College along with his colleagues, where he also received the chair of obstetrics.

He founded the Chicago Hospital for Women and Children alongside Mary Harris Thompson, and later helped her graduate after being rejected by Rush due to her sex. The same year he financially aided Thompson in founding the Woman's Medical College of Chicago where he became president of the faculty and Board of Trustees.

Alongside others, Byford founded the American Gynecological Society in 1876, where he served as vice-president, and later as president in 1881. After Rush created a chair of gynaecology specifically for Byford, he returned to the faculty where he remained until his death in 1890 following an attack of angina pectoris.

Early life and education 
Byford was born on March 20, 1817, in Eaton to Henry T. Byford, a mechanic, and Hannah Swain; he was the eldest of three children.  His ancestors originated in Suffolk in England.

Shortly after his birth, Byford's family moved to New Albany in southwest Indiana. His father died nine years later, which left Byford having to work multiple jobs to provide for the family. Eventually they moved to his maternal grandfather's farm in Crawford County. To further support his family, Byford apprenticed with a tailor in Palestine, Illinois, whom he called "a kind-hearted Christian gentleman by the name of Davis". After two years Byford left the shop and finished his apprenticeship at Vincennes, where he served for four more years.

While apprenticed, Byford borrowed books and devoted his spare time to study in fields such as chemistry, physiology, and natural history, and learned Latin, Greek and French. After his apprenticeship, in 1837, Byford was taken into the office of Joseph Maddox, whom after eighteen months, impressed by his progress, suggested him to appear before the state's three-man examining board. After his qualifications were approved by the board, he chose the town of Owensville and started his practice on August 8, 1838.

After two years of his practices in Owensville, Byford moved to Mount Vernon where he associated with Hezekiah Holland, and married his daughter, Mary Anne Holland, on October 3, 1840. Byford continued to acquire experience, and attended lectures at the Medical College of Ohio where he graduated as Doctor of Medicine in 1845.

Career

1849–1859 professorships at Evansville and Rush 
In October, 1850, Byford was invited to take the chair of anatomy at the Evansville Medical College, and moved there. After two years, he was moved to the chair of theory and practice of medicine, in which he remained until the college went defunct in 1854. Byford became a member of the American Medical Association in 1854, and was made a special committee on scrofula. On the subject of scrofula, Byford prepared an elaborate and valuable report, in which he talked about the importance of physical and mental exercise, which gained him wide-spread attention and added to his growing reputation, which led to him being made vice-president of the association in May, 1857.

In the fall of that year, Byford was discovered by Rush Medical College due to his publications, and was asked to join their faculty as professor of obstetrics and diseases of women and children, succeeding the former professor John Evans, who later became the Governor of Colorado due to his shift to politics.

1859–1879 founding of institutions 
Byford first showed his longtime interest in physical examination, when he published a paper called "Advantages of the Prone Position in Examining the Foetal Circulation as a Diagnostic Sign of Pregnancy" in 1858. A year later, Byford resigned from Rush after they refused to improve their curriculum. He then, in the same year, along with his colleagues Hosmer Johnson, Nathan Smith Davis, Ralph Isham, Edmund Andrews and David Rutter, founded the Chicago Medical College where he received the chair of obstetrics. In 1860, Byford also performed the first ovariotomy in Chicago, later detailing the procedure of the surgery in a book he wrote.

Byford played a substantial role in the founding of the Chicago Hospital for Women and Children, in 1865, alongside Mary Harris Thompson, whom he provided financial, professional, and psychological support. Due to his contributions, the hospital was popularly known as the "Dr. Byford's Hospital" until it was renamed the "Mary Thompson Hospital" upon the sudden death of Thompson in 1895.

Five years later, when Thompson was feeling the need for further medical education, she applied to Rush but was rejected due to her sex. Following this, Byford urged the Chicago Medical College to admit her along with three other women, leading Thompson to receive her second Doctor of Medicine degree in 1870. The same year, Byford financially aided Thompson to establish the Woman's Medical College of Chicago and became president of the faculty, as well as the board of trustees, and held both positions until his death. Byford also, alongside others, founded the American  Gynecological  Society in 1876, of which he was elected vice-president and president in 1881. When Rush created a chair of gynecology specifically for Byford in 1879, he returned to the college and held the position until his death.

Later life and death 

Three days before his death he performed a laparotomy, and on May 21, 1890, Byford succumbed to an attack of angina pectoris. He was buried at Graceland Cemetery in Chicago.

Nathan Smith Davis, a friend of Byford, said in his eulogy:

References

Works cited 
 
 
 
 
 
 
 
 

1817 births
1890 deaths
People from Eaton, Ohio
American gynecologists
American educators
Deaths from coronary artery disease
University of Cincinnati College of Medicine alumni
Burials at Graceland Cemetery (Chicago)